Ansan station is a subway station on Line 4 of the Seoul Metropolitan Subway. The station is located in the Wongok neighborhood of Ansan, Korea and is one of multiple stations serving the city.

Before the extension of Line 4 to Oido station, Ansan station served as the line's terminus station. It is still a terminal station for some trains. It is located close to the factory section of the town. There are many restaurants and shops located around the station. Ansan has a large and growing foreign community living in this neighborhood and there are many foreign restaurants close to the station.

Station layout

Passengers

References

Metro stations in Ansan
Seoul Metropolitan Subway stations
Railway stations opened in 1988